Tommy Gemmell (2 July 1930 – 8 January 2004) was a Scottish footballer, who played as an inside forward for St Mirren for his whole senior career. Gemmell, who made over 250 league appearances for the club, helped St Mirren win the 1959 Scottish Cup Final.

He also played for the Scotland national football team twice in May 1955, scoring one goal.

See also 
List of one-club men

References

External links 

Scotland career details at London Hearts Supporters Club

1930 births
2004 deaths
Footballers from South Ayrshire
Scottish footballers
Scotland international footballers
Scottish Football League players
St Mirren F.C. players
Scottish Football League representative players
Association football inside forwards
Irvine Meadow XI F.C. players
Scotland B international footballers
People from Tarbolton